Shaarani village is located within the Qus Center of the Qena Governorate in the Arab Republic of Egypt. According to the 2020 statistics, the total population of Al-Shaarani reached 26,654 people, including 14,422 men and 12,232 women.

See also 

 List of cities and towns in Egypt

Notes

References

External links 

Qus
Qus Markaz villages